Lewis Douglas Hollands (born 25 October 1940) is a New Zealand former cricketer. He played six first-class matches for Otago between 1969 and 1972.

Sporting career
Born in Gore, Southland, Hollands was a right-handed batsman. His highest first-class score was 66 not out against Northern Districts in January 1970, when he and Jack Alabaster put on an unbroken partnership of 118 for the eighth wicket. 

Hollands represented Southland in four sports: cricket, rugby, tennis and badminton. He played Hawke Cup cricket for Southland between 1965 to 1974.

See also
 List of Otago representative cricketers

References

External links
 

1940 births
Living people
New Zealand cricketers
Otago cricketers
New Zealand rugby union players
New Zealand male badminton players
New Zealand male tennis players
People from Gore, New Zealand